Savin may refer to:

 Savin (name)
 Juniperus sabina, or savin, a shrubby juniper plant
 Savin (photocopiers), a photocopier company acquired by Ricoh
 Savin, Bulgaria, a village in Kubrat Municipality, Razgrad Province
 SAVIN, Statewide Automated Victim Information & Notification

See also
 Savin Hill, a neighbourhood of Boston, Massachusetts, USA
 Savin Hill (album) by the Street Dogs
 Savin Rock, a section of West Haven, Connecticut, USA
 Saint-Savin (disambiguation), one of four communes of France